Laterculus may refer to:

 Laterculus, a Latin list or table, in particular:
Laterculus Veronensis or Verona List, a list of Roman provinces
 Helicina laterculus, a species of snail; see Helicina